The word Fono is used in different countries of Polynesia. In general, the term means councils or meetings great and small and applies to national assemblies and legislatures, as well as local village councils or any type of meeting between people. 

Fono can refer to:

Polynesian countries
American Samoa Fono, the legislature of American Samoa
Legislative Assembly of Samoa, sometimes referred to as the Samoan Fono
The Fono of Faipule, a former legislature in Samoa
Parliament of Tokelau, also referred to as the General Fono

In music
Fono (DJ), British DJ
Fono (band), British–American band

Other places
A village in Togo - Fono, Togo